Andy Faustin (born 25 March 1997) is a French-born Haitian footballer who plays as a midfielder. He was called up the Haiti national football team for matches against Costa Rica and Jamaica in September 2016.

References

External links
 

1997 births
Living people
People from Sarcelles
French sportspeople of Haitian descent
Association football midfielders
Haitian footballers
French footballers
Ligue 2 players
Valenciennes FC players
S.V. Zulte Waregem players
Footballers from Val-d'Oise